The 1946 Lane Dragons football team, also sometimes known as the "Red Dragons", was an American football team that represented Lane College in the Southern Intercollegiate Athletic Conference (SIAC) during the 1947 college football season. In their 10th season under head coach Edward Clemons, the Dragons compiled an 8–2 record (4–0 against SIAC opponents), lost to Arkansas AM&N in the Cattle Bowl, gave up only 3.5 points per game on defense, and outscored opponents by a total of 189 to 35.

The Dickinson System rated Lane as the No. 5 black college football team for 1946, behind No. 1 Tennessee A&I, No. 2 Morgan State, No. 3 Tuskegee, and No. 4 Wilberforce. Lane ranked first among the black college teams in scoring defense.

The team played its home games at Lane College Athletic Field and Rothrock Field, both located in Jackson, Tennessee.

Schedule

References

Lane
Lane Dragons football seasons
Lane Dragons football